Natal is the capital and largest city of the state of Rio Grande do Norte, located in northeastern Brazil. According to IBGE's 2021 estimate, the city had a total population of 896,708, making it the 19th largest city in the country. Natal is a major tourist destination and an exporting hub of crustaceans, carnauba wax and fruits, mostly melon, sugar apple, cashew and papaya. It is the country's closest city to Africa and Europe, with its Greater Natal International Airport connecting Natal with many Brazilian cities and also operating some international flights. The city was one of the host cities of the 2014 FIFA World Cup.

History

The Brazilian coast has long been home to indigenous peoples, generally members of the Tupi language family. While written records do not exist, archeological evidence suggests that pre-European inhabitants moved from the Amazon to the coasts approximately 2,900 years ago. 

Near the Rio Grande de Norte, the Potiguara people were the most numerous indios encountered by the Portuguese. It is believed that in 1500, prior to contact with the Europeans, there were over 1 million people living in coastal Brazilian among all of the local groups. This nearly equaled the population of Portugal at the time.

The northeastern tip of South America,  to the north of Natal and the closest point to Europe from Latin America, was first visited by European navigators in 1501, as part of the 1501–1502 Portuguese expedition led by Amerigo Vespucci. Vespucci renamed the area after the saint of the day, Cape São Roque; the prior indigenous name is unknown. For decades thereafter, no permanent European settlement was established in the area.

In 1597, after some years during which French pirates, led by Jacques Riffault, established regular commercial activities with the native population, the ninth Portuguese Governor-General of Brazil, Francisco de Sousa, ordered the expulsion of the buccaneers. The successful expedition against 50 Frenchmen and their Amerindian allies was led by the Captain-Major of the Captaincy of Pernambuco, Manuel de Mascarenhas Homem, with the assistance of Jerônimo de Albuquerque Maranhão.

Albuquerque Maranhão began on January 6, 1598, the construction of the Fort of the Holy Kings or of the Magi-Kings ("Forte dos Santos Reis" or "Forte dos Reis Magos"), named after the Three Wise Men, honored in the Christian feast of the Epiphany, celebrated on that day.

Natal (which translates to "Nativity" or "Christmas" in Portuguese) was founded on December 25, 1599, giving the village outside the fort the modern name of the city. The fort, city, and surrounding areas were occupied by Dutch forces from 1633 to 1654. They rechristened the fort "Fort Ceulen" after one of their commanders.
The sandy soil of Natal prevented the city from becoming a producer of sugarcane during the colonial times. For centuries, the economy of the state was based on the raising of cattle in the dry interior lands.  Cattle were sent alive to the larger centers, to be used as traction, or were turned into jerked beef, for food; the most typical food of Natal, "carne de sol" (sun meat), has origins in that jerked beef.

In the last century, Natal benefited from the growth of the salt industries (the north of Rio Grande do Norte is the largest producer in Brazil) and petroleum (the largest inland Brazilian reserves are in the State). Natal grew quickly, but in a somewhat planned way (compared to other major Brazilian cities). Tourists (first Brazilians, more recently foreigners) discovered the city, which became one of the major tourist destinations in Brazil.

Because of its strategic position (Natal is one of the cities in Brazil nearest to Western Europe and Africa, especially Dakar, Senegal), an American air base was built in a suburb of Natal named Parnamirim during World War II, as part of the so-called Operation Rainbow.  This base provided support for allied troops fighting in north Africa. Thousands of American soldiers were sent to Natal.  Their presence left traces in the culture of the city. The city also held the Potenji Conference, which took place right after the Casablanca Conference and defined the active participation of Brazil in the war, being the only Latin American country to send troops overseas to fight in Europe.

Geography
Natal lies on the Atlantic Ocean, at the mouth of the Potengi River.

Climate
Natal has a typical tropical climate, specifically a tropical wet and dry climate (Köppen climate classification: As), with warm to hot temperatures and high relative humidity all throughout the year. However, these conditions are relieved by a near absence of extreme temperatures and pleasant trade winds blowing from the ocean. The greatest amount of rain falls between March and July.

Known as the "City of the Sun" and also as "The City of the Dunes", Natal is located in the northeastern tip of Brazil. Lying about six degrees south of the equator the sun shines on for more than 3,000 hours every year. During the summer season it normally reaches above  with the water at a soothing .

Demographics

According to the IBGE of July 2013, there were 862,044 people residing in the city, and 1,485,405 people residing in the Greater Natal (metropolitan area). This is the second smallest capital the country in territorial extension, therefore, the population density is high, . It is the 21st-largest city in the country and the sixth largest in the northeastern region. The racial makeup of the city was 48% Pardo (Multiracial), 48% White, 3.20% Black, 0.80% Asian or Amerindian.

Economy

With its dozens of sandy, white beaches, such as Ponta Negra and its famous Morro do Careca, Tabatinga - the cliff of dolphins, Pirangi do Norte, Redinha, Pipa and Genipabu with its famous fixed sand dunes and imported dromedaries, tourism is the most important industry of Natal, attracting Brazilians, Europeans (many from Spain, England, Scandinavia, Germany, Portugal, Italy and France), and U.S. citizens alike. There has been an increase of 211% in foreign tourism in Natal between 2002 and 2007 (for the same time period the increase of foreign tourism in Brazil was 62,8%); This is a due to the accessibility of Natal and the appeal Brazil has for an increasing number of tourists, clearly showing that Natal is the area leading the Brazilian tourism boom. Natal is the number one area receiving international investments in Brazil. Natal will benefit enormously from the massive future investments on the coastline.

It is also a relevant administrative center for the oil industry (Rio Grande do Norte being the second largest oil-producing state in Brazil). Thus, its Federal University of Rio Grande do Norte (UFRN) is a national scientific research pole on Oil Sciences (ranging from Geophysical to Law studies), supported mostly by Petrobras financing.

The fishing industry is strong (shark cartilage being a major export to Japan) as is the cultivation of tropical fruit, especially mangos, guavas, and cashews (the fruit and the nuts).

In fact, the largest cashew tree in the world is located near the coast in the neighborhood of Pirangi, south of the city center. This tree has a circumference of 500 metres and occupies an area of 7,300 m², making it 70 times the size of average cashew trees.

The GDP for the city was R$206,832,516,000 (2019).

The per capita income for the city was $44,149 (2016) and $55,900.68 in 2019.

Education

 
Portuguese language is the official national language, and thus the primary language taught in schools. But English and Spanish are part of the official high school curriculum.

Educational institutions
 Federal University of Rio Grande do Norte (UFRN);
 International Institute of Physics (IIP-UFRN);
 International Institute for Neuroscience of Natal (IINN-ELS);
 Estadual do Rio Grande do Norte (UERN);
 Universidade Potiguar (UnP);
Instituto Federal do Rio Grande do Norte(IFRN);
 Instituto de Educação Superior Presidente Kennedy (Kennedy);
 Faculdade Natalense para o Desenvolvimento do Rio Grande do Norte (Farn);
 Faculdade de Natal (FAl);
 Faculdade de Excelência Educacional do Rio Grande do Norte (FATERN); (IINN-ELS)
 Faculdade Câmara Cascudo (FCC);
 Faculdade de Ciências Cultura e Extensão (FACEX);
 Faculdade Católica Nossa Senhora das Neves (FCNSN);
 Faculdade Maurício de Nassau (UNINASSAU);
Federal Rural University of the Semi-arid Region (UFERSA).

There are more than 15 universities in whole state of Rio Grande do Norte.

Main sights
Natal Dunes State Park

The Natal Dunes State Park is considered the second largest urban park in Brazil. It includes 1,172 hectares of land, and allows observation of several vegetal and animal species, which are typical of the Atlantic Forest. The tour is along a trail, accompanied by trained guides. The park also has a jogging track, and stays open for visitors from Tuesday to Sunday.

Museums
Museums in Natal include: Museu de Arte Sacra, Museu de Cultura Popular, Espaço Cultural Palácio Potengi, Instituto Histórico e Geográfico do Rio Grande do Norte, Pinacoteca do Rio Grande do Norte, Museum Camara Cascudo, Memorial Camara Cascudo.

Natal Aquarium

The Natal Aquarium was founded and is run by a family of biologists and retired environmentalists. Besides the exhibit, the aquarium also serves as a surgery center for sea animals. The Aquarium is located between the Oceânica Avenue and the beach. The Aquarium exhibits about 60 marine species. There are about 30 small aquariums, where the species are put individually or in small groups of two or three species. Most species were collected at the Brazilian and Rio Grande do Norte coast. Species include several kinds of fish (including piranhas), sea horses, shrimps, lobsters, stingrays, octopus, etc. In a refrigerated aquarium, there is a couple of penguins.

The Largest Cashew Tree in the World
The Cashew of Pirangi is the biggest cashew tree in the world. In 1994, it entered the Guinness book as the tree which covers the largest area, 8,400 square meters; it is larger than a typical football pitch. Due to a genetic mutation, the branches of this tree grow outwards rather than upwards; thus when a branch touches the ground, roots are not created, rather a new ramification starts to grow. There is even a gazebo located in the cashew, a popular attraction among tourists.

Forte dos Reis Magos
Forte dos Reis Magos or Fortaleza dos Reis Magos is a medieval fortress that was the first milestone of the city – founded on 25 December 1599 – on the right side of the bar of the river Potenji (today near the Ponte Newton Navarro). It received its name based on the date of commencement of its construction, 6 January 1598, at Epiphany Catholic calendar.

Natal City Park

The Natal City Park Dom Nivaldo Monte, or simply the City Park is an urban park. Inaugurated on July 21, 2008 with architectural project of Oscar Niemeyer. It has a unique, monumental tower, and has a museum and restaurant. As of January 2011, the entire park is closed due to lack of funding from the city.

Festa Junina (Saint John Festival)
Festa Junina was introduced to Northeastern Brazil by the Portuguese for whom St John's day (also celebrated as Midsummer Day in several European countries), on the 24th of June, is one of the oldest and most popular celebrations of the year. Differently from what happens on the European Midsummer Day, the festivities in Brazil do not take place during the summer solstice but during the tropical winter solstice. The festivities traditionally begin after the 12th of June, on the eve of St Anthony's day, and last until the 29th, which is Saint Peter's day. During these fifteen days, there are bonfires, fireworks, and folk dancing in the streets. Typical foods and beverages are served. As during Carnival, these festivities involve wearing costumes (in this case, peasant costumes), dancing, heavy drinking, and visual spectacles (fireworks display and folk dancing). Similar to what happens on Midsummer and St John's Day in Europe, bonfires are a central part of these festivities in Brazil. Festa Junina in other cities of the state, especially in the city of Mossoró which gathers thousands of people during the month of June.

Newton Navarro bridge

The Newton Navarro bridge is one of the highest bridges in Brazil and has over a gorgeous sunset seen from Potengi River. It makes the connection with the beaches of the north coast of the state. In addition to unburden the city traffic, the bridge became a tourist attraction because of its large size.

Historic Center
This area comprises the districts of Ribeira and Cidade Alta, which are the oldest neighborhoods of the city, which have characteristics of the first centuries of the history of Brazil, highlighting important aspects of Portuguese colonization.

Barreira do Inferno
The Barreira do Inferno Launch Center is the first base to launch rockets from Brazil. With the construction of another center in Brazil, today, it only launches rockets, small and medium businesses and is open to visitation of tourists to know the rockets, but must make an appointment to visit the center.

Parrachos de Maracajaú

The Parrachos de Maracajaú of coral reefs are the seven kilometers of beach in Maracajaú, forming natural pools. It is one of the places in Brazil where the sea is the most crystalline and suitable for diving. In Maracajaú also a water park, the Ma-Noa Park.

Genipabu

Genipabu (or Jenipabu) is a beach, a complex of dunes, a lagoon and an area of environmental protection (APA) located in Natal capital city, one of the most famous post-cards of the Brazilian state Rio Grande do Norte. It is a huge dunes and a lagoon of fresh water, with strong attraction for tourism. The region has a good infrastructure of hotels, inns, restaurants, beach tents, tours of "buggies", rafts and dromedaries. It is played in the dunes around the lake called "esquibunda" stakeholders sit down the dunes on top of planks of wood, to dive in the waters of the lagoon. The tours of "buggies" are offered in the local "with emotion" or "no emotion", according to the degree of risk, it is recommended, however, are chosen accredited professionals responsible for security not only of tourists, but the middle - environment.

Ponta Negra and Via Costeira

Ponta Negra is a famous beach and a neighborhood located in the Brazilian city of Natal in the state of Rio Grande do Norte. In the extreme south of the beach, is located in Morro do Careca (Bald Hill), a large dune. The extreme north of the beach, is located at Via Costeira (Coastal Way), a road in the middle of coastal dunes that connect the various beaches of the city. The beach is completely urbanized and there are several points shops, restaurants, bars and night clubs. The sand itself is lined with "tents", or huts, that serve food and drinks to beachgoers day and night. A common sight on the beach are "jangadas", simple, multicolored, local fishing boats typical of northeastern Brazil. The Via Costeira (Coastal Way) is a great avenue built next to the dunes and beaches of the city, including making the connection of several beaches in the state.

Pipa Beach
A beach Paradise that attracts thousands of tourists every year.

Other attractions
 As Natal means Christmas in Portuguese, possibly in December are some attractions such as concerts, plays, meeting writers and the traditional burning of fires, and the city be decorated with Christmas purposes.
 Cape São Roque, point of the Brazilian coast close of Africa.
 Calcanhar Lighthouse, the highest lighthouse in Brazil.

Culture

Carnival in Natal, known as "Carnatal", is one of the largest off-season carnivals in Brazil. Carnatal takes place sometime in November or December, in the streets around the Arena das Dunas Stadium (traffic around the stadium changes radically during Carnatal days). During the days of party, a huge truck (called "trio elétrico"), with a band on the top and sound boxes all around, drives slowly along the streets. The crowd follows the trio elétrico singing, dancing, jumping to the sound of the music.

Natal is also home to the "Mada", a national festival of pop rock national, and the "Verão de Todos", a summer festival.

The patron saint of the city is Our Lady of Presentation.

Transportation

International airport

Air Force Base
Natal Air Force Base - ALA10, one of their most important bases of the Brazilian Air Force, is located in the nearby city of Parnamirim.

Highways

Federal Highway BR-101 is the most important access to Natal, coming from the South of Brazil, through the boundary with the municipality of Parnamirim. For those who come from the State of Ceará, the principle access is by the Federal Highway BR-304, through the boundary with the municipality of Macaíba, where you pick up BR-226 taking people to Natal. Leaving Natal, an important access to the southern Potiguar coast is the "Sun Route" (Rota do Sol) as RN-063 is known by, and which takes you to the beaches of Pirangi, Búzios, Tabatinga, up to the municipality of Nísia Floresta. The North Shore is accessible from the Newton Navarro bridge, following the Praia do Forte to Genipabu, and the Igapó Bridge, following the district of Igapó by BR-101 to Touros, and by BR-406 to Macau.

Natal is connected to all the 167 municipalities of Rio Grande do Norte and dozens of locations and Potiguar districts, through the Passenger Bus Terminal of Natal (Terminal Rodoviário de Passageiros de Natal), located in the Eastern Zone of the city. All the accesses to the countryside of the state are through the Metropolitan region of Natal, composed of the municipalities of Ceará-Mirim, Emaús, Extremoz, Macaíba, Monte Alegre, Nísia Floresta, Parnamirim e São Gonçalo do Amarante. Buses with direct destinations to various Brazilian capitals also leave from the Passenger Bus Terminal of Natal. The cities with regular weekly schedules are: Belo Horizonte, Fortaleza, Goiânia, João Pessoa, Palmas, Recife, Salvador, São Luiz e Teresina.

Bus
Buses are the cheapest way to move around Natal. Passes or magnetic cards can be purchased beforehand, but it is easiest to pay the conductor. There are large buses, micro buses and vans, driving along the same streets, charging the same fares.

All the main touristic spots within Natal are well served by buses. People may expect to travel standing up on the big buses (not so with micros and vans). Typical waiting time is 15 min during the peak hours, up to one hour.

Rail
The Sistema de Trens Urbanos de Natal is a two-line commuter rail system that operates over 56 km of track, and served 3.7 million passengers in 2018.

Taxi
There are plenty of taxis in the city. Taxis are white cars and have a red plate. Fares are the same, regardless of how new and comfortable the car is.
Fares are regulated by the government. The normal prices are: US$2 to start metering, US$1 per km and US$5 per waiting hour. The only exception to these prices are the so-called special taxis at the airport. From 10:00 pm to 6:00 am at weekdays, and all hours at weekends (and, depending on a decree by the mayor, all times during the month of December), there is a 20% increase in the above prices, this is indicated by a number 2 showing in the fare meter. There are several tele-taxis companies in Natal.

Buggy

The dune buggy is the vehicle used most to drive along the beaches. Some companies offer tours in Land Rovers and other 4WD vehicles, these cars offer much more comfort, but buggy drivers claim that the buggy is more flexible. Riding a buggy, people feel the sun and the wind. Buggies are safe, accidents with buggies are much less frequent than accidents with other cars (most dune buggy drivers are certified by the Tourist Authority).

Distances
 João Pessoa:  (110 mi);
 São Paulo:  (1870 mi);
 Rio de Janeiro: ;
 Belo Horizonte: ;
 Brasília: ;
 Salvador: ;
 Porto Alegre: .

Port
The Port of Natal is specialized in cold storage cargo such as fruit, fish and shrimp, among others. It has its own customs facilities and is connected to Europe by direct navigation lines, mainly to the ports of Vigo, Rotterdam and Sheerness.

Neighborhoods

Sports

The main soccer teams of Natal are:
 América de Natal
 ABC Futebol Clube
 Alecrim Futebol Clube

Stadiums
 Arena das Dunas
 Maria Lamas Farache Stadium (Frasqueirão)
 Juvenal Lamartine Stadium

Gymnasiums
Ginásio Nélio Dias
 Palácio dos Esportes

2014 FIFA World Cup
Natal was one of the host cities of the 2014 FIFA World Cup, for which Brazil was the host nation. The Dunas Arena was built in place of the old Machadão stadium. It is building a new airport, Greater Natal International Airport, to be the largest airport in Latin America. It is also investing in a public transport system using the system of light rail called VLT de Natal, and other projects of infrastructure.

David Beckham had announced plans for a football academy in Natal, called the Beckham World of Sport, to coincide with the 2014 FIFA World Cup.

11th World Maxibasketball Championship
Natal will be the first Brazilian city to host a World Maxibasketball Championship. The 11th World Maxibasketball Championship will occur in July 2011, winning among the cities which also wanted to host the event: Punta del Este in Uruguay; Vancouver in Canada and Eugene in the United States. The facilities of the modern Nélio Dias gymnasium should be used to house the event that will bring to the capital of Rio Grande do Norte about 3,500 athletes from around the world.

Notable people

Natalenses is the name in Brazil for residents of Natal.

 Abraham Palatnik, artist
 Aldo Parisot, cellist and cello teacher
 André Oliveira, football player
 Gleydson de Oliveira Santos, football player 
 Antônio Filipe Camarão, Native American
 Café Filho, lawyer and ex-president of Brazil (1954–1955)
 Carlos Paz de Araújo, scientist and inventor
 Clodoaldo Silva, paralympic swimmer
 Diego Pelicles da Silva, football player
 Fernanda Tavares, international model
 Garibaldi Alves Filho, politician and former President of the Federal Senate (2007–2009)
 Kell, football player
 Jussier da Silva, mixed martial artist
 Larissa Costa, model and Miss Brasil 2009
 Luís da Câmara Cascudo, anthropologist, folklorist, journalist, historian, lawyer, and lexicographer
 Marinho Chagas, football player
 Matuzalém, football player
 Patrício Freire, mixed martial artist champion
 Patricky Freire, mixed martial artist
 Oscar Schmidt, basketball player
 Ramalho, football player
 Renan Barão, mixed martial artist
 Richarlyson, football player
 Ronny Markes, mixed martial artist
 Abraham Palatnik (1928-2020), artist and inventor
 Roberta Sá, singer
 Virna Dias, volleyball player

Twin towns

Natal, Rio Grande do Norte is twinned with:
 Bethlehem, Palestine
 Córdoba, Argentina
  Porto Alegre, Rio Grande do Sul, Brazil
  Rio de Janeiro, Rio de Janeiro, Brazil
  Salvador, Bahia, Brazil
  Fortaleza, Ceará, Brazil
 Eilat, Israel

References

See also 

 André de Albuquerque Square
 List of theatres in Natal

External links

 Natal Travel Guide
 o Guia de Viagens de Natal
 
 Official governmental tourism portal

 
Populated places established in 1599
Municipalities in Rio Grande do Norte